Meena Singh (born 1 January 1962 in Varanasi, Uttar Pradesh) is an Indian politician. She entered politics in 2008. She represented Bikramganj (Lok Sabha constituency) in 14th Lok Sabha and Arrah (Lok Sabha constituency) in the 15th Lok Sabha as a member of Janata Dal (United).

Early life
Meena Singh was born to Naina Devi and Rameshwar Singh. She got a degree in Arts from Banaras Hindu University in 1982. Before entering into the Indian politics, she was serving her husband's constituency people and was a house wife.

Political career
Meena Singh was first elected as MP in January 2008 by-election from Bikramganj after her husband's death, but she resigned just after 6 months because of Rahul Raj encounter. She was again elected to Arrah (Lok Sabha constituency) in 2009 from Janata Dal United. However, she lost the 16th Lok Sabha election in 2014.

Personal life
Meena Singh married Ajit Kumar Singh, a full-time politician by profession. They have a son, Vishal Singh (born 23 January 1987), who holds a Bachelor of Business Administration from Amity Business School. Ajit Singh died in 2007.

References

1962 births
Living people
India MPs 2009–2014
People from Arrah
Lok Sabha members from Bihar
Women in Bihar politics
Janata Dal (United) politicians
21st-century Indian women politicians
21st-century Indian politicians
Candidates in the 2014 Indian general election
Banaras Hindu University alumni